Sylvia Bernstein (1914–1990) was an American painter.

Her work is included in the collections of the Brooklyn Museum and the Whitney Museum of American Art.

References

1914 births
1990 deaths
20th-century American women artists